Margarita Tacheva (June 4, 1936 – December 18, 2008) was an eminent Bulgarian historian, a full professor in ancient history and Thracology.

Selected publications

References 
 
 
 
 

20th-century Bulgarian historians
Thracologists
People from Shumen
1936 births
2008 deaths
21st-century Bulgarian historians